Pengyou is a popular social network by Tencent, also well known for QQ Video, Tencent Weibo, QQ, Qzone, WeChat, etc.

It has often been considered as the Asian language version of Tagged. Because of its multiple open platforms, it's the biggest online community in China in terms of registered users. Pengyou says it has over 200 million users.

The site uses real names with an emphasis on real friendships, and allows users to register with any valid email address. The site has both a social area but also a section for corporate outreach, where friends can become ‘fans’ of various companies, and companies can use the site to engage with their consumers.

References

External links
 
 https://www.pengyou.com
 https://www.wechat.com

Chinese social networking websites
Chinese companies established in 2010
Companies based in Shenzhen
Tencent